Eurata histrio is a moth of the subfamily Arctiinae. It was described by Félix Édouard Guérin-Méneville in 1843. It is found in Bolivia, Paraguay and the Brazilian states of Rio de Janeiro and São Paulo.

References

 

Arctiinae
Moths described in 1843